The Gazi-Husrev-beg Library is a public library in Sarajevo, Bosnia and Herzegovina founded in 1537 by the Ottomans, and is part of a larger complex with Gazi Husrev-beg Medresa. It holds one of the most important collections of Islamic manuscripts in Bosnia-Herzegovina, including many originally donated by Gazi Husrev-beg. The collection survived through Bosnian war and Siege of Sarajevo. The library also holds a sizable number of books, journals, newspapers, documents and photographs.

As part of the larger complex of Gazi Husrev-begova Medresa, the library facilities are part of the National Monument designation.

Foundation
In 1537, the Ottoman Empire governor of Bosnia, Gazi Husrev-beg, established a madrasa for the education of the people of the region. In the charter for its creation, the governor stipulated that "whatever money remains from the construction of the madrasa shall be used for purchasing good books, which will be used in the madrasa by readers, and for copying from them by those who engage in science."

The library and the madrasas functioned for over three hundred years as one unit until, in 1863, the library was moved to its own room, where it stayed until 1935 when it was moved to the Sarajevo Mufti’s office outside the Careva Mosque. The library continued to grow until the whole building of the former mufti's office was used for housing the library's holdings. It remained in this location until the start of the Siege of Sarajevo in 1992.

Destruction and safekeeping
In 1697, an Austrian general Eugene of Savoy, raided the library, destroying many historical works. Some of the most important documents to be lost were the Sarajevo court registers, chronicling land ownership, marriages, and other important legal events.

During the Yugoslav Wars in the 1990s, much of the city of Sarajevo was under siege by forces of the Army of the Republika Srpska. Many of the printed books were moved to the Careva Mosque for safekeeping. The manuscripts were moved eight times during the nearly four-year siege of the city. The 500 most valuable manuscripts were placed inside the vaults of the Privredna Banka, where they were hidden. They remained there until the siege was lifted.

Rebuilding
The Gazi-Husrev-beg Library re-opened on January 15, 2014, after 10 years of construction. The new library was built largely from a grant of US$8.8 million from the country of Qatar and has the capacity to hold nearly 500,000 items. The new library is three stories high and made of glass and marble. It has reading rooms, a conservation room and a 200-seat auditorium with WiFi headsets that allows for simultaneous translations of up to three different languages. In the basement is a museum dedicated to Bosnia's history of literacy.

Holdings
The library contains over 100,000 volumes of manuscripts, printed books, and documents in Arabic, Turkish, Persian, Bosnian and other languages. More than 10.500 library units include codices of manuscripts with approximately 20,000 texts in the fields of Islamic sciences, Oriental languages, belles-lettres, philosophy, logic, history, medicine, veterinary science, mathematics, astronomy, and others.

Since the Siege of Sarajevo and the restoration of the library, several important Islamic manuscripts have been added to the library's collection. Some of the most important of these manuscripts are the following:

 The Ihya’ulum al-din is the oldest manuscript in the library and was written by Abu Hamid Muhammed al-Gazali (d. 1111) in Arabic.
 The Diwan of Hafiz Shirazi (d. 1389), written in Persian, is illuminated with beautiful Islamic miniatures.
 The Tuhfat al-ahrar is  a didactic poem written by the Persian writer Nur al-Din ‘Abd al-Rahman Jami (d. 1486), and is one of the most representative pieces of Islamic calligraphy found in the collection. It was copied circa 1576.
 *Firdaws al-akhbar bi-masur al-khitab is a hadith collection copied by ‘Abd al-Salam ibn Muhammad al-Khwarizmi in 1151 in Hamadan, Iran.
 The third volume of the Qur’an commentary in Arabic, which covers the  Suras Six and Seven written by Abu Ishaq Ahmad ibn Muhammad ibn Ibrahim al-Talabi al-Nisaburi (d. 1035) and  copied by Barakat ibn ‘Isa ibn Abu Ya‘la Hamza in 1176.
 Several illustrations from the encyclopaedic work Ma‘rifetname, written in Turkish by Sheikh Ibrahim Haqqi al-Erzurumi (d. 1780).
 A portion of the Book Four of the al-Qanun, a famous work of medicine, written in Arabic by Ibn Sina (d. 1037).
 An Arabic commentary on Ashkal al-ta’sis fi al-handasa, a geometric treatise by Musa ibn Muhammad Qadi-zada (d. 1412), which was copied in 1675.
 The Arabic al-Mulakhkhas fi al-hay’a,  a manuscript on astronomy by Mahmud ibn Muhammad ibn ‘Umar al-Jagmini al-Khawarizmi (d. 1334). This particular work was copied in 1658.

There are also significant copies of Mus'hafs, illuminated copies of the Qur'an, contained in the library's collection as well as a variety of teaching licenses from the Ottoman Empire period, and 35,000 printed books in Bosnian and other European languages.

References

External links

 

Libraries established in 1537
Libraries in Bosnia and Herzegovina
Buildings and structures in Sarajevo
Islamic libraries
Rebuilt buildings and structures in Bosnia and Herzegovina
1537 establishments in the Ottoman Empire
Tourist attractions in Sarajevo
Medieval Bosnia and Herzegovina architecture
National Monuments of Bosnia and Herzegovina
Ottoman period in the history of Bosnia and Herzegovina
L